Echinorhyncha is a genus of orchids. It contains 5 known species, all native to Colombia and Ecuador.

Echinorhyncha antonii (P.Ortiz) Dressler - Colombia
Echinorhyncha ecuadorensis (Dodson) Dressler - Ecuador
Echinorhyncha litensis (Dodson) Dressler - Colombia, Ecuador
Echinorhyncha manzurii (P.Ortiz) P.A.Harding & Manzur - Colombia
Echinorhyncha vollesii (G.Gerlach, Neudecker & Seeger) Dressler - Colombia, Ecuador

See also 
 List of Orchidaceae genera

References

External links 

Orchids of South America
Zygopetalinae genera
Zygopetalinae